Plesiocystiscus bavayi is a species of very small sea snail, a marine gastropod mollusk or micromollusk in the family Cystiscidae.

Description

Distribution
This marine species occurs off New Caledonia.

References

External links
  Boyer, F. (2003). The Cystiscidae (Caenogastropoda) from upper reef formations of New Caledonia. Iberus. 21(1): 241-272

Cystiscidae
Gastropods described in 2003